Tourism Corporation Khyber Pakhtunkhwa set up as a limited company in 1991 to develop Khyber-Pakhtunkhwa's tourism potential.
It offers a variety of services in key tourist sites in Khyber-Pakhtunkhwa, as well as visits to attend the Shandur Polo Festival as well as to famous Buddhist monasteries like Takht-i-Bhai and Peshawar's old city historical sites like Sethi Mohallah.

Objectives
TCKP has been assigned to:
Promote and develop the tourism industry of the province by involving both the private and public sectors.
Fully protect and preserve the culture, arts, history, heritage - both tangible & intangible, traditions, environment and biodiversity of the target areas.
Develop the socio-economic conditions of the people and areas having tourism potential.
Gradually and systematically identify and develop all the existing and potential areas for attracting domestic and international tourists.
Make TCKP a self-financing organisation.

See also
Pakistan Tourism Development Corporation

References

External links
 Tourism Corporation of Khyber Pakhtunkhwa
 Tourist Development Corporation of Punjab
 Sindh Tourism Development Corporation
 Tourism Department of Gilgit Baltistan

Tourism in Khyber Pakhtunkhwa
Government of Khyber Pakhtunkhwa
Transport companies established in 1991
1991 establishments in Pakistan
Tourism agencies